The 2022 CAF Women's Champions League WAFU Zone B Qualifiers is the second edition of the CAF Women's Champions League WAFU Zone B Qualifiers organised by the WAFU for the women's clubs of association nations. This edition will be held from on september 2022 in Abidjan, Ivory Coast. The winners of the tournament qualified automatically for the 2022 CAF Women's Champions League final tournament .
The competition has therefore been moved to Yamoussoukro, the capital of Côte d’Ivoire and will take place from Saturday, August 20 to Friday, September 2, 2022.

Participating clubs

Venues

Match officials

Draw
The draw for this edition of the tournament was held on 20 July 2022 at 11:00 UTC (13:00 CAT) in Morocco. The seven teams were drawn into 2 group   with   teams finishing first and second in the groups qualifying for the knockout stages.

Qualifying Tournaments

Tiebreakers
Teams are ranked according to points (3 points for a win, 1 point for a draw, 0 points for a loss), and if tied on points, the following tiebreaking criteria are applied, in the order given, to determine the rankings.
Points in head-to-head matches among tied teams;
Goal difference in head-to-head matches among tied teams;
Goals scored in head-to-head matches among tied teams;
If more than two teams are tied, and after applying all head-to-head criteria above, a subset of teams are still tied, all head-to-head criteria above are reapplied exclusively to this subset of teams;
Goal difference in all group matches;
Goals scored in all group matches;
Penalty shoot-out if only two teams are tied and they met in the last round of the group;
Disciplinary points (yellow card = 1 point, red card as a result of two yellow cards = 3 points, direct red card = 3 points, yellow card followed by direct red card = 4 points);
Drawing of lots.

All times are Time in Ivory Coast (UTC+0).

Group stage

Group A

Group B

Knockout stage

Semi-finals

Third place match

Final

Awards and statistics

Goalscorers

own goal:  Mariam Ouattara

References 

2022 CAF Women's Champions League
Women's Champions League
CAF
West African Football Union competitions